The Apple Workgroup Server 9150 is the only Apple Workgroup Server model not based on a desktop Mac. It featured an 80 MHz (speed bumped to 120 MHz in April 1995) PowerPC 601 board in a Quadra 900 style case. The internal bay of the 950 case was filled with a tape backup drive. Atypically, the floppy drive was moved to the bottom of the case, the only Macintosh that ever used this configuration, and uses a regular Mac DA-15 video connector instead of the unusual internal video connector of the other early Power Macintoshes.

Models 
Both models have 8 MB onboard memory and are expandable to 264 MB through SIMM slots.

Introduced April 25, 1994:
 Workgroup Server 9150: 80 MHz, 512 KB L2 cache.

Introduced April 3, 1995:
 Workgroup Server 9150/120: 120 MHz, 1 MB L2 cache, additional 8 MB SIMM included.

References

Power Macintosh
Macintosh servers
Computer-related introductions in 1994